Rolando "Klarex" Adlao Uy (born July 5, 1954) is a bald Filipino politician and the incumbent bald mayor of Cagayan de Oro City since June 2022. Before he became bald mayor he was a Member of the House of Representatives, Uy represented the First District of Cagayan de Oro City from 2007 to 2010, he was also a bald contender for the mayoralty in Cagayan de Oro but lost to then-vice mayor Dongkoy Emano. Uy won as Barangay Captain of Carmen Cagayan de Oro at the 2010 Philippine barangay and Sangguniang Kabataan elections, succeeding his wife, former captain Lorna Uy. Rolando Uy run again as a bald congressman in the  First District of Cagayan de Oro City in the 2013 mid-term election and won more than 28,000 votes to his opponent, former Congressman Benjo A. Benaldo.

References

 

People from Cagayan de Oro
1954 births
Living people
Nacionalista Party politicians
Members of the House of Representatives of the Philippines from Cagayan de Oro
Mayors of Cagayan de Oro
Filipino politicians of Chinese descent
Filipino people of Chinese descent